Miss XV, sometimes stylized as Miss 15, is a Mexican teen musical comedy-drama television series, it is loosely inspired on 1987 telenovela Quinceañera. Pedro Damián produced the series for Nickelodeon and Canal 5 in 2012.

Synopsis 
Miss XV follows the story of two teenage best friends, Valentina and Natalia, (who were born on the same day at the same hour), who dream of the perfect quinceañera birthday party, and long to become the girlfriends of their respective crushes, Niko, an amateur musician, and Eddy, Valentina's big brother.

During their adventure to their quinceañera, both of them, especially Valentina, encounter their rivals—Leonora, an arrogant teenage girl who is crazily in love with Niko and constantly manipulate him into breaking up with Valentina, and Alexis, an attractive and spoiled man who often bullies Niko manipulates Valentina into loving him.

Production

Pre-production and background 
Miss XV is inspired by the 1986 telenovela Quinceañera, starring Adela Noriega and Thalía. Producer Pedro Damián explained that the project is not a remake, nor is it an adaptation of the 1987 telenovela, Quinceanera. The project was first announced in late 2010, and filming began on October 12, 2011 in Mexico City. Filming concluded in Mexico City in early June 2012. There are 120 episodes. The program began airing on April 16, 2012 for Nickelodeon Latin America and began airing on May 14, 2012 on Canal 5. The series finale aired on September 28, 2012 for cable, and aired on October 26, 2012, for Canal 5 in Mexico.

The program debuted in the United States on Unimás on March 2, 2013, and was moved to Galavisión as of March 25, 2013, in Brazil on March 4, 2013 and Italy on March 30, 2013.

A second season, in the form of a spin-off, was considered by producers at Televisa largely due to the show and band, Eme 15's commercial success in Mexico. However, in May 2013, Eme 15 confirmed that plans for a second season or spin-off series of the show were cancelled. The show's producers declined to commission a second season, and instead, opted to focus on Eme 15's success as a musical act.

Original cast and recasting 
In 2010, Miss XV (previously called Miss XV: Sueña Princesa) was announced as the latest television production from  producer Pedro Damián as a collaboration for Canal 5, and Nickelodeon Latin America. Mexican actresses Danna Paola, Natasha Dupeyrón, and Renata Notni were all cast as leads for the telenovela. A trailer for the telenovela featuring all three actresses was released in late 2010. Mexican actor Eddy Vilard was previously attached to the project for a lead role alongside Danna Paola, but dropped out.

By the beginning of 2011, Miss XV was cancelled before production began for unknown reasons. However, in June 2011, the series was reformatted and recast. Most of the original actors previously attached to the project were dropped and their roles were recast. Casting was conducted in Mexico City during June and July 2011. Dupeyrón's role was not recast and she remained an original cast member. Danna Paola and Renata Notni were both dropped from the project. Paola stated that she was no longer interested and wished to work on her solo album.

Paulina Goto was cast as one of the lead protagonists, replacing Danna Paola. Eiza González auditioned for one of two lead roles. Gonzalez was considered for a part, but was later told that she lost the role because producers felt she was too old.  Argentine singer and actress Brenda Asnicar also auditioned for a role, but did not receive a part.

Casting finalization 
In August 2011, producers had completed casting in Mexico City. Paulina Goto, Eleazar Gómez, Natasha Dupeyrón, Yago Muñoz, and Jack Duarte were confirmed as the first five lead cast members. However, Pedro Damián revealed that producers were looking to cast third actress as the female antagonist "La Black Princess". In mid-August 2011, newcomer Macarena Achaga, an Argentine MTV Latin America television hostess and model, was confirmed as the lead female antagonist, "Leonora Martínez" . Miss XV is Achaga's acting debut.

Cast
 Paulina Goto - Valentina Contreras (Protagonist)
 Natasha Dupeyrón - Natalia D'Acosta (Protagonist)
 Eleazar Gómez - Alejandro "Alexis" Reyes Mendez (Villain)
 Yago Muñoz - Nicolas "Niko" Perez Palacios (Co-protagonist)
 Jack Duarte- Eduardo "Eddy" Contreras (Co-protagonist)
 Macarena Achaga - Leonora Martínez (Villain)
 Gabriela Platas - Marina Landeros de D'Acosta
 Raquel Garza - Catalina Rosenda Gónzalez de los Monteros y Galicia de García de Contreras
 Verónica Jaspeado - Margara Ramona "Margarita, Magos" Contreras
 Sergio DeFassio - Rómulo Pedraza Sotelo
 Amairani - Juana Palacios / Lady Venenosa
 Reynaldo Rossano - Quirino Contreras
 Ignacio Casano - Sebastián D'Acosta
 Antonio De Carlo - Arístides Reyes / Magic Dragon
 Beatriz Moreno - Teodora Cuevas
 Oswaldo Zárate - Dosberto del Valle
 Fuzz - Lula López
 Pamela Ruz - Renata Domensaín
 Natalia Sainz - Tania Meza
 Alfonso Dosal - Maximiliano "Max" Menéndez
 Paola Torres - Fanny del Olmo
 José Eduardo Derbez - Patricio "Pato" Fuentes Pedraza
 Mariana Quiroz - Daniela "Manzanita" Contreras Gónzalez de los Monteros
 Lourdes Canale † - Filomena "Miss Filo" Zapata
 Charly Rey - Camilo
 Araceli Mali - Maestra Miranda
 Montserrat Fligelman - Federica Martínez
 José Pablo Minor - Princípe Antonio Hernández de López y Martínez de Cervantes y del Hojeara Camacho
 Werner Bercht - Enrique "Kike" Martínez
 Nicole Vale - Paula Gil
 Joshua Gutiérrez - Miguel
 Raquel Pankowsky - Griselda
 Nicole Fur - Debbie Landeros / Agente Rosa 
 Hendrick Marine - Fabián Espejo
 Queta Lavat - María
 Maricarmen Vela - Viuda de Robles

Guest stars
 Dulce María
 Beto Cuevas
 Moderatto

Comparison to Quinceañera 
Miss XV is a loose version of 1987 telenovela Quinceañera, and many of its characters have counterparts in both television series.

 Valentina Contreras/Maricruz Fernández: Valentina is a representative of one of the two main characters, Maricruz Fernández, with her best friend Natalia/Beatriz, with whom she shares date of brith, they plan to hold their 15-year-old party together, she has crush in Niko/Pancho, a boy from a different social class whose mother disapproves. Two other characters try to avoid the relationship with Niko/Pancho, Leonora/Leonor who has a crush with him and pretends to be friends with Valentina/Maricruz while secretly sabotaging and envying her, along with Alexis/Memo, who openly has a crush on her and causes trouble for Valentina/Maricruz and Niko/Pancho.
 Natalia D'Acosta/Beatriz Villanueva: Natalia is representative of the second of the main characters, Beatriz Villanueva, she shares a date of birth with her best friend Valentina/Beatriz. She has a difficult family situation, because her parents do not get along. She is also in love with her best friend's brother Eddy/Gerardo.
 Nicolas "Niko" Perez/Francisco “Pancho”: Niko is a representative of Pancho, he is a boy whose social class is lower than that of the rest of the young characters, Niko/Pancho lives only with his mother, whom he constantly helps by working and he doesn't study to help his mother. He is in love with Valentina/Maricruz but they cannot start a relationship due to the disapproval of her mother and the secret plans of Leonora/Leonor and Alexis/Memo.
 Alejandro "Alexis" Reyes/Guillermo "Memo" López: Alexis is the main villain of both stories, he is in love with Valentina/Maricruz and doesn't hide his feelings, constantly trying to make her fall in love, she always rejects him and always clarifies to him that she dislikes him, but he never leaves her alone, together with Leonora/Leonor they try to make plans that Valentina/Maricruz does not start a relationship with Niko/Pancho.
 Leonora Martínez/Leonor Gutiérrez: Leonora/Leonor is a villain in both stories, her parents don't spend any time at home and she only has a little contact with her older sister, who advises her to be a better person. She has a crush on Niko/Pancho although he always made it clear to her that he only sees her as a friend, she envies Valentina/Maricruz and pretends to be her friend when she secretly makes plans to affect her along with Alexis/Memo.
 Eduardo "Eddy" Contreras/Gerardo Fernández: He is the older brother of Valentina/Maricruz, he has a relationship with Natalia/Beatriz, his sister's best friend. He is the less faithful counterpart character comparing him to the Quinceañera version.

Musical Group: Eme 15

Eme 15 was a band composed of the six main actors in the series. The members are Paulina Goto, Eleazar Gómez, Natasha Dupeyrón, Macarena Achaga, Yago Muñoz, and Jack Duarte. The band will sing songs presented on the show. Eme 15's debut performance was at Mexico's Kids Choice Awards on September 3, 2011 in Mexico City. They performed their first single, 'Wonderland'. The official music video for Wonderland was filmed in October 2011 in Las Pozas, a park in Xilitla, San Luis Potosí. The music video premiered on April 4, 2012 on cafedecamilo.com  'Wonderland' was officially released for digital download on iTunes in Mexico on April 24, 2012. Eme 15's debut album was available for on June 26, 2012 for physical and digital release.

On December 18, 2013, it was officially announced to fans via the band's official Twitter account that the band would split up, following their final concert on January 5, 2014 at the Mega Feria Imperial de Acapulco in Acapulco, Mexico.

References

External links
 Official Televisa Website

Spanish-language Nickelodeon original programming
2012 Mexican television series debuts
Spanish-language telenovelas
Televisa telenovelas
Children's telenovelas
Teen telenovelas
2010s Mexican television series
2012 Mexican television series endings
Nickelodeon telenovelas
Television series about teenagers